Revson Cordeiro dos Santos (born 20 December 1987 in Cascavel), simply known as Revson, is a Brazilian footballer who plays as a midfielder for Azuriz Pato Branco.

References

External links 
 
 Revson at ZeroZero

1987 births
Living people
Brazilian footballers
Association football midfielders
Grêmio Foot-Ball Porto Alegrense players
Sociedade Esportiva e Recreativa Caxias do Sul players
Associação Atlética Iguaçu players
Pato Branco Esporte Clube players
Avaí FC players
Associação Desportiva São Caetano players
Esporte Clube Internacional de Lages players
C.D. Nacional players
PFC CSKA Sofia players
Primeira Liga players
First Professional Football League (Bulgaria) players
Expatriate footballers in Portugal
Expatriate footballers in Bulgaria
Azuriz Futebol Clube players